Gary Robert McFarland (October 23, 1933 – November 3, 1971) was an American composer, arranger, vibraphonist and vocalist. He recorded for the jazz imprints Verve and Impulse! Records during the 1960s. Down Beat magazine said he made "one of the more significant contributors to orchestral jazz". A 2015 review of a McFarland DVD documentary called him "one of the busiest New York jazz arrangers of the 1960s". The review further stated that McFarland's "ascendance coincided with the rise of bossa nova, and McFarland was adept at translating the mercurial song form into orchestrations. He wrote some beautiful orchestral settings for great soloists, yet wasn’t immune to commercial forces."

Life
McFarland was born in Los Angeles, on October 23, 1933, but grew up in Grants Pass, Oregon.

He attained a small following after working with jazz luminaries Bill Evans, Gerry Mulligan, Johnny Hodges, John Lewis, Stan Getz, Bob Brookmeyer, and Anita O'Day.

As well as his own albums and arrangements for other musicians he composed the scores to the films Eye of the Devil (1966) and Who Killed Mary What's 'Er Name? (1971). By the end of the 1960s, he was moving away from jazz towards an often wistful or melancholy style of instrumental pop, as well as producing the recordings of other artists on his Skye Records label (run in partnership with Norman Schwartz, Gábor Szabó and Cal Tjader, until its bankruptcy in 1970). He also produced and arranged the soft-rock album Genesis by singing sisters Wendy and Bonnie Flower.

McFarland was considering a move into writing and arranging for film and stage. However, at age 38, on November 3, 1971 – the same day that he completed the Broadway album, To Live Another Summer; To Pass Another Winter – McFarland died in New York City at St. Vincent's Hospital from a lethal dose of liquid methadone that he had ingested at Bar 55 at 55 Christopher Street in Greenwich Village.  It is not known whether he took the drug on purpose or someone spiked his drink; police did not investigate. McFarland had been married since 1963 to Gail Evelyn Frankel (maiden; 1942–2007); they had a son, Milo (1964–2002), and a daughter, Kerry.  Milo McFarland died of a heroin overdose at the same age as his father, 38.

Discography

As leader
 1961: The Jazz Version of "How to Succeed in Business without Really Trying" - Verve
 1963: Point of Departure - Impulse!
 1963: The Gary McFarland Orchestra: Special Guest Soloist: Bill Evans - Verve
 1964: Soft Samba - Verve
 1965: Jazz at The Penthouse (1965 club date released in 2014 ad CD with the DVD documentary This Is Gary McFarland!)
 1965: Tijuana Jazz with Clark Terry - Impulse!
 1965: The In Sound - Verve
 1966: Eye of the Devil (soundtrack) 1966: Simpático with Gábor Szabó - Impulse!
 1966: Profiles - Impulse!
 1966: Soft Samba Strings - Verve
 1967: The October Suite with Steve Kuhn - Impulse!
 1968: Scorpio and Other Signs - Verve
 1968: Does the Sun Really Shine on the Moon? - Skye
 1968: America the Beautiful: An Account of Its Disappearance - Skye
 1969: Slaves with Grady Tate - Skye
 1969: Today - Skye
 1971: Butterscotch Rum with Peter Smith - Buddah Records
 1972: Requiem for Gary McFarland - Cobblestone Records

As producer/arranger
 1961: All the Sad Young Men – Anita O'Day (Verve)
 1961: Gloomy Sunday and Other Bright Moments – Bob Brookmeyer (Verve) – two compositions by McFarland
 1962: Essence – John Lewis (Atlantic) – all compositions by McFarland
 1962: Big Band Bossa Nova – Stan Getz (Verve)
 1963: Gerry Mulligan '63 – Gerry Mulligan (Verve) – 3 compositions by McFarland
 1963: The Groovy Sound of Music – Gary Burton (RCA)
 1965: Latin Shadows – Shirley Scott (Impulse!)
 1966: Waiting Game – Zoot Sims (Impulse!)
 1969: Genesis – Wendy and Bonnie (Skye)
 1969: Dreams – Gábor Szabó (Skye)
 1969: 1969 – Gábor (Skye)
 1969: Lena & Gabor – Lena Horne and Gábor (Skye)
 1971: Steve Kuhn – Steve Kuhn (Buddah)

As sideman
With Bob Brookmeyer
 Trombone Jazz Samba'' (Verve, 1962)

References

External links
 "This is Gary McFarland!" Documentary
"Twelve Essential Gary McFarland Performance" by Bill Kichner (Jazz.com)
 

1933 births
1971 deaths
American jazz composers
American male jazz composers
American jazz vibraphonists
American jazz singers
Cool jazz musicians
West Coast jazz musicians
Jazz musicians from California
Musicians from Los Angeles
Skye Records artists
Verve Records artists
20th-century American singers
20th-century American composers
Burials at Green River Cemetery
20th-century American male musicians
20th-century jazz composers